Yılancık Ada (literally "Small Snake Island") is a Turkish island in the Mediterranean Sea. Its main businesses are tourism and fishing.

Islands of Turkey